The Dulaji class are a class of environmental research ships (AGER) currently in service with the People's Liberation Army Navy (PLAN), and the design is also modified for cable layer (YRC) in PLAN service, with both versions have received the same NATO reporting name Dulaji class because they share the same hull. The exact type of this class remain unknown as of 2022, because no official information has been released, despite the ships have already been in service for more than a decade. In addition to the usual task of conducting regular environmental sampling, monitoring/surveillance and research missions, these ships are also tasked with additional task of sewer transfer and treatment from other ships to prevent sewer onboard other ships from overflowing into the sea and thus causing pollution, and thus these ships also act as sewer vessels for vessel sewage discharging.

Ships of this class in PLAN service are designated by a combination of two Chinese characters followed by a two-digit number. For the environmental research version, the second Chinese character is Jian(监), meaning monitor in Chinese, since its primary duties included monitoring environment. For the cable layer version, the second Chinese character is Lan(缆), meaning cable (for communication & power) in Chinese, since its primary duties are laying & maintaining communication and power cables. The first Chinese character denotes which fleet the ship is service with, with East (Dong, 东) for East Sea Fleet (ESF), North (Bei, 北) for North Sea Fleet (NSF), and South (Nan, 南) for South Sea Fleet (SSF). However, the pennant numbers are subject to change due to changes of Chinese naval ships naming convention, or when units are transferred to different fleets. Specification:
Length: 30 meter
Displacement: 300 ton
Ships of the environmental research version (AGER):

Ships of the cable layer version (YRC):

References

Auxiliary ships of the People's Liberation Army Navy